Anne Reeve Aldrich (April 25, 1866 – June 28, 1892) was an American poet and novelist. Her works include The Rose and Flame and Other Poems and The Feet of Love.

Biography
Aldrich was born in New York City on April 25, 1866. Her father died when she was eight;  her mother moved to the country, where she educated Aldrich. By the time she was a teenager, Aldrich was proficient in composition and rhetoric, was able to translate French and Latin, and was able to name all local plants and insects.

Aldrich wrote poetry constantly from a young age.  At age 17, she was published in Lippincott's Monthly Magazine. Poems in other periodicals followed and eventually led to published collections of poems.

Her first volume of poetry, The Rose of Flame, was published in 1889. A second volume, Songs About Love, Life, and Death, was published posthumously.

Aldrich died at the age of 26 in New York on June 28, 1892.

Selected works
The Rose of Flame: And Other Poems of Love (New York: G.P. Putnam's Sons, 1889)
The Feet of Love (New York: Worthington Co, 1890)
Songs About Life, Love and Death (New York: C. Scribner's Sons, 1892)
Nadine and Other Poems (New York, 1893)
Gabriel Lusk (New York: C.T. Dillingham, 1894)
A Village Ophelia (New York: G.W. Dillingham, 1899)

References

External links

Anne Reeve Aldrich at Society for the Study of American Women Writers
Anne Reeve Aldrich at "My Poetic Side"
Books by Reeves at Online Books Library

1866 births
1892 deaths
American women poets
American women novelists
19th-century American poets
19th-century American novelists
Poets from New York (state)
Writers from New York City
19th-century American women writers
Novelists from New York (state)
Wikipedia articles incorporating text from A Woman of the Century